Zingarelli is an Italian surname. Notable people with the surname include:

Italo Zingarelli (1930–2000), Italian film producer
Nicola Zingarelli (1860-1935), Italian lexicographer, author of above
Niccolò Antonio Zingarelli (1752-1837), Italian composer

Italian-language surnames